Allophalerus is an extinct genus of beetle in the family Ommatidae.

Systematics 

 †Allophalerus antiquus (Ponomarenko 1964) Karabastau Formation, Kazakhstan, Oxfordian
 †Allophalerus aphaleratus (Ponomarenko 1969) Kyzyl-Kiya, Kyrgyzstan, Pliensbachian
 †Allophalerus bontsaganensis (Ponomarenko 1997) Dzun-Bain Formation, Mongolia, Aptian
 †Allophalerus incertus (Ponomarenko 1969) Dzhil Formation, Kyrgyzstan, Hettangian
 †Allophalerus latus (Tan et al. 2007) Yixian Formation, China, Aptian
 †Allophalerus maximus (Ponomarenko 1968) Karabastau Formation, Kazakhstan, Oxfordian
 †Allophalerus okhotensis (Ponomarenko 1993) Emanra Formation, Russian Federation, Turonian
 †Allophalerus tenuipes (Ponomarenko 1964) Karabastau Formation, Kazakhstan, Oxfordian
 †Allophalerus verrucosus (Ponomarenko 1966) Zaza Formation, Russia, Aptian

References 

Ommatidae
Fossil taxa described in 2020
Prehistoric beetle genera